Happy Valley is a closed railway station in Adelaide, South Australia. It was a ground level stopping place during the passenger transport days of this line, and a 1965 reference mentioned that it was no longer used at that date.

A road bridge, carrying South Road on a diversion by-passing Reynella, crossed the line shortly after Happy Valley.

The stop is now completely destroyed, the entire Willunga railway line having been dismantled in 1972, and the site is now the location of the Panalatinga Road interchange of the Southern Expressway and Main South Road.

References

Further reading

Australian Railway Historical Society Bulletin No 336, October 1965

Disused railway stations in South Australia